Niebuszewo is a municipal neighbourhood of the city of Szczecin, Poland, in Północ (North) District, north of the Szczecin Old Town and Middle Town. As of January 2011 it had a population of 17,654.

History 

Before 1945 when Stettin was a part of Germany, the German name of this suburb was Stettin-Zabelsdorf.

See also 
 Niebuszewo-Bolinko

References 

Niebuszewo